Gura and Güra are surnames. Notable people with the surname include:

Alan Gura (born 1971), American litigator
Eugen Gura (1842–1906), German operatic baritone
Larry Gura (born 1947), left-handed baseball pitcher
Philip F. Gura (born 1950), American scholar, writer, editor, and educator
Werner Güra (born 1964), German classical tenor in opera, concert and Lied, also an academic teacher in Zurich